Konstantin Vladimirovich Sashilin (born 28 April 1989) is a former Russian football midfielder.

Career
Sashilin made his professional debut for FC Tom Tomsk on 15 July 2009 in the Russian Cup game against FC Alania Vladikavkaz.

External links
 
 

1989 births
Sportspeople from Tula, Russia
Living people
Russian footballers
Association football midfielders
FC Khimki players
FC Tom Tomsk players
FC Khimik-Arsenal players
FC Arsenal Tula players